José Allende (1793 – June 29, 1873) was a 19th-century Peruvian politician. He was born in Lima, Peru. He was Prime Minister of Peru (August 2, 1871 – 1872).

Bibliography
Basadre, Jorge: Historia de la República del Perú. 1822 - 1933, Octava Edición, corregida y aumentada. Tomos 4, 5 y 6. Editada por el Diario "La República" de Lima y la Universidad "Ricardo Palma". Impreso en Santiago de Chile, 1998.
Tauro del Pino, Alberto: Enciclopedia Ilustrada del Perú. Tercera Edición. Tomo 1. AAA/ANG.  Lima, PEISA, 2001. 

1793 births
1873 deaths
People from Lima
Peruvian soldiers
Prime Ministers of Peru